Deus vult (Ecclesiastical Latin: 'God wills it') is a Christian motto relating to Divine providence. It was first chanted by Catholics during the First Crusade in 1096 as a rallying cry, most likely under the form Deus le veult or Deus lo vult, as reported by the Gesta Francorum (ca. 1100) and the Historia Belli Sacri (ca. 1130).

In modern times, the Latin motto has different meanings depending on the context. It has been used as a metaphor referring to "God's will", by Christians throughout history, such as the Puritans, or as a motto by chivalric orders such as the Equestrian Order of the Holy Sepulchre of Jerusalem.

Meaning and variants 
The phrase appears in another form in the Vulgate translation of 2 Samuel 14:14 from the Bible: nec vult Deus perire animam ("God does not want any soul to perish").

The variants Deus le volt and Deus lo vult, incorrect in Classical Latin, are forms influenced by Romance languages. According to Heinrich Hagenmeyer, the personal pronoun 'le' (or 'lo') was very likely part of the original motto as shouted during the First Crusade at Amalfi, since both the authors of the Gesta Francorum and the Historia Belli Sacri report it. Later variants include the Old French Dieux el volt and the Classical Latin Deus id vult ("God wills it") or Deus hoc vult ("God wills this").

History

First Crusade 
The battle cry of the First Crusade is first reported in the Gesta Francorum, a chronicle written ca. 1100 by an anonymous author associated with Bohemond I of Antioch shortly after the successful campaign. According to this account, while the Princes' Crusade were gathered in Amalfi in the late summer of 1096, a large number of armed crusaders bearing the sign of the cross on their right shoulders or on their backs cried in unison "Deus le volt, Deus le volt, Deus le volt". Medieval historian Guibert de Nogent mentions that "Deus le volt" has been retained by the pilgrims to the detriment of other cries.

The Historia belli sacri, written later around 1131, also cites the battle cry. It is again mentioned in the context of the capture of Antioch on 3 June 1098. The anonymous author of the Gesta was himself among the soldiers capturing the wall towers, and recounts that "seeing that they were already in the towers, they began to shout Deus le volt with glad voices; so indeed did we shout".

Robert the Monk 
Robert the Monk, who re-wrote the Gesta Francorum ca. 1120, added an account of the speech of Urban II at the Council of Clermont, of which he was an eyewitness. The speech climaxes in Urban's call for orthodoxy, reform, and submission to the Church. Robert records that the pope asked western Christians, poor and rich, to come to the aid of the Greeks in the east:

When Pope Urban had said these and very many similar things in his urbane discourse, he so influenced to one purpose the desires of all who were present, that they cried out, 'It is the will of God! It is the will of God!' When the venerable Roman pontiff heard that, with eyes uplifted to heaven he gave thanks to God and, with his hand commanding silence, said: Most beloved brethren, today is manifest in you what the Lord says in the Gospel, "Where two or three are gathered together in my name there am I in the midst of them." Unless the Lord God had been present in your spirits, all of you would not have uttered the same cry. For, although the cry issued from numerous mouths, yet the origin of the cry was one. Therefore I say to you that God, who implanted this in your breasts, has drawn it forth from you. Let this then be your war-cry in combats, because this word is given to you by God. When an armed attack is made upon the enemy, let this one cry be raised by all the soldiers of God: It is the will of God! It is the will of God!

Robert also reports that the cry of Deus lo vult was at first shouted in jest by the soldiers of Bohemond during their combat exercises, and later turned into an actual battle cry, which Bohemond interpreted as a divine sign.

Tyerman, writing in 2006, suggests that the cheering at Urban's speech was "probably led by a papal claque".

Other uses
Deus lo vult is the motto of the Equestrian Order of the Holy Sepulchre of Jerusalem, a Roman Catholic order of chivalry (restored 1824).

Admiral Alfred Thayer Mahan (1840–1914), a Protestant Episcopalian, used the expression for his argument of the dominion of Christ as "essentially imperial" and that Christianity and warfare had a great deal in common: Deus vult!' say I. It was the cry of the Crusaders and of the Puritans and I doubt if man ever uttered a nobler [one]."

The 1st CCNN Division "Dio lo Vuole" ("God wills it") was one of the three Italian Blackshirts Divisions sent to Spain in 1937 during the Spanish Civil War to make up the "Corpo Truppe Volontarie" (Corps of Volunteer Troops), or CTV.

In 1947, Canadian prelate George Flahiff used the expression Deus Non Vult as the title of an examination of the gradual loss of enthusiasm for the crusades at the end of the 12th century, specifically of the early criticism of the crusades by Ralph Niger, writing in 1189.

Disseminated in the form of hashtags and internet memes, Deus vult has enjoyed popularity with members of the Christian right, as well as the alt-right, because of its perceived representation of the clash of civilizations between the Christian West and the Islamic world. Crusader memes, such as an image of a Knight Templar accompanied by the caption "I'll see your jihad and raise you one crusade", are popular on far-right internet pages. The motto is also used by Christian nationalist groups in Europe and was portrayed on large banners during marches celebrating the Polish National Independence Day in 2017.

See also

 Be'ezrat Hashem, "with the help of Heaven"
 Deo volente, "God willing"
 In hoc signo vinces, "in this sign, you will conquer"
 Inshallah, "if God wills," and Mashallah, "what God has willed"
 Allāhu akbar, "God is [the] greatest"
 God works in mysterious ways
 Churches Militant, Penitent, and Triumphant
 Divine retribution
 Just war theory
 Muscular Christianity
 Will of God
 Jai Shri Ram, Hindu expression, translating as "Glory to Lord Rama"

Notes

References

Bibliography 

B. Lacroix, "Deus le volt!: la théologie d'un cri", Études de civilisation médiévale (IXe-XIIe siècles). Mélanges offerts à Edmond-René Labande, Poitiers (1974), 461–470.

Anti-Arabism in Europe
Anti-Islam sentiment
Internet memes
Latin religious words and phrases
Crusades
First Crusade
Stereotypes of Arab people
Religious formulas